Shandong Sports Lottery Women's Volleyball Club is a professional volleyball team which play in Chinese Volleyball League, which is sponsored by China Sports Lottery. It was sponsored by Laishang Bank.

CVL results

Team member 2013-2014

Former players

Chinese volleyball clubs